Matthew John Lowe (born 11 March 1996) is an English professional footballer who plays for Accrington Stanley, as a midfielder.

Career
Born in Warwick, Lowe played for Cambridge United, Wealdstone and Brackley Town, before signing for Accrington Stanley in June 2022.

References

1996 births
Living people
English footballers
Cambridge United F.C. players
Wealdstone F.C. players
Brackley Town F.C. players
Accrington Stanley F.C. players
Association football midfielders
National League (English football) players
English Football League players